State Route 237 (SR 237) is a nearly  north–south signed route in Cuyahoga County, Ohio. Its southern terminus is at SR 82 in Strongsville, and its northern terminus is in Lakewood where U.S. Route 20 (US 20) joins the US 6 / SR 2 concurrency.

Route description

SR-237 begins at Royalton Road (SR 82) in Strongsville, heading northbound towards Berea as Prospect Road. About four miles in, the route turns eastwards onto Bagley Road in Berea, then north onto Front Street 0.1 miles later.

After continuing on Front Street for about 1 mile, the route makes a slight turn onto North Rocky River Drive, which becomes a freeway as it enters Brook Park after Sheldon Road. This portion of the route, which connects Cleveland Hopkins International Airport to Interstate 480 (I-480) and I-71, is known as the Berea Freeway (or the Airport Freeway).

At the northeast corner of the airport, SR 237 has an interchange with SR 17 (Brookpark Road), I-480, and I-71. In this interchange, SR 237 leaves the Berea Freeway for surface streets, where SR 237 northbound has a short concurrency with SR 17 westbound; the Berea Freeway continues northeast as unsigned County Route 237 and merges into I-71.

North of this interchange, SR 237 proceeds along Rocky River Drive (which is parallel to the Rocky River) until its northern terminus at Clifton Boulevard (US-6).

History

The original route of SR 237 was incorporated into the southern section of Ohio State Route 79.  Most of the current routing of SR 237 was originally Ohio State Route 232.

The Berea Freeway was converted from an expressway to freeway between 1983 and 1987.

Major intersections

References

237
Strongsville, Ohio
Transportation in Cuyahoga County, Ohio